Cecilia Jiménez (born 27 July 1995) is a Spanish Synchronised swimmer.

She participated at the 2019 World Aquatics Championships, winning a medal.

References

1995 births
Living people
Spanish synchronized swimmers
World Aquatics Championships medalists in synchronised swimming
Artistic swimmers at the 2019 World Aquatics Championships